Lucrezia is a female singer from Italy, born in Milan. She is best known for her 2001 cover of Madonna's 1986 hit "Live to Tell", which reached No.2 on Billboard's Hot Dance Music/Club Play chart. While Madonna's version was more of a haunting ballad, Lucrezia's cover is much more uptempo. This cover received considerable airplay in dance clubs and on MTV.

Discography 

 2000: "Lookin 4 Love"
 2001: "Live to Tell"
 2003: "Follow Your Heart"

References

External links 
 

21st-century Italian women singers
Italian pop singers
Singers from Milan
Living people
Year of birth missing (living people)